Alistair Daniel Brammer (born 12 November 1988) is an English actor best known for playing Jean Prouvaire in both the 2010 special Les Misérables: 25th Anniversary Concert and the 2012 musical film Les Misérables. Brammer performed as 'Chris' in the Miss Saigon 25th anniversary performance.

Originally from Exmouth, Devon, Brammer is the youngest of seven children. In 2005, he was one of 35 students from around England chosen to participate in the 20th anniversary celebration of Les Misérables at Queen's Theatre in the West End. In 2008, while a student at Exeter College, he competed in Any Dream Will Do, and made it to the final 20 contestants, although he was not selected to be on the show. However, Any Dream Will Do judge Bill Kenwright asked him to appear in the 2008–2009 UK tour of Joseph and the Amazing Technicolor Dreamcoat, where he played Zebulon and understudied both Benjamin and Joseph.

In 2009, he made his West End debut as Marius in Les Miserables, where he spent 18 months in the role. He said of Les Mis, "I should be sick to death of the show, but I can't get over it. It's my favourite." He also played the role of Jean Prouvaire in the Les Misérables 25th Anniversary Concert at The O2 on 3 October 2010.

He also appeared as Walter and understudied Claude in a European tour of Hair, before he was cast as Jean Prouvaire in the 2012 film Les Misérables. Since that time, he also appeared as Billy in the 2012 revival of Taboo at the Brixton Clubhouse, and until 15 March 2014 was playing Billy and understudying Albert in the West End production of War Horse.

On 21 November 2013, it was announced that he would be starring as Chris in the West End revival of Miss Saigon. Previews began on 3 May 2014. He revived his role as Chris in the Broadway revival of Miss Saigon which began previews on 1 March 2017. He remained with the Broadway revival until its closing on 14 January 2018.

On 5 December 2015, Brammer made his first appearance as Jack Diamond, the receptionist, in Casualty.

In December 2016, Brammer played the role of Oliver in the Finale special of Vicious. Oliver served as main characters Freddie and Stuart's brand new upstairs neighbour following the departure of Oliver's flat's previous occupant Ash (Iwan Rheon), whom Freddie and Stuart were close to.

From 22 July 2019, Brammer will play the role of Fiyero in the West End production of Wicked.

Filmography

Theatre credits

References

External links

English male film actors
People from Exmouth
1988 births
Living people
English male musical theatre actors
Musicians from Devon
Male actors from Devon
21st-century English male actors